Kat Green (born Kathryn Greenblatt) is an American actress, composer, producer and writer. She's best known for being the first woman to play Marvel Comics' Alicia Masters in The Fantastic Four in 1994, directed by Oley Sassone and co-produced by Roger Corman.

Career

Kathryn Greenblatt tried her hand at acting beginning in 1988 by shortening her name down to Kate Green and then to Kat Green, but she stopped by 1994. She has continued to work on as a composer, producer and sometimes a writer for various television series and a few movies as a supervisor.

Her composer and producer credits include; Nearlyweds, A TV Movie in 2013, 1 episode of CBS Schoolbreak Special which also guest starred in, a mini-series called Hotel Room as a production assistant for 1 episode, helping with the music composing for 5 episodes of Disney's American Dragon: Jake Long and the movie Pucked from 2006 which starred Jon Bon Jovi.

She also did some more soundtrack work on a reality show called Born to Drive, another film called Nonames as well as Catch That Kid, Intoxicating, Clover Bend, She's All That with Freddie Prinze Jr., and Chuck & Buck.

Filmography

Sources
http://spinoff.comicbookresources.com/2014/01/13/watch-trailer-for-doomed-untold-story-of-roger-cormans-fantastic-four-film/

External links

Living people
20th-century American actresses
American film actresses
American television actresses
American film score composers
American television composers
American women film score composers
Women television composers
American women screenwriters
Year of birth missing (living people)
21st-century American women musicians